Fusigobius signipinnis, commonly called flasher sandgoby or signal goby among various vernacular names, is a species of marine fish in the family Gobiidae.

The flasher sandgoby is widespread throughout the tropical waters of the central Indo-Pacific from Indonesia to the Philippines.

This sandgoby is a small sized fish, it can grow up to a size of  length.

References

External links
http://www.marinespecies.org/aphia.php?p=taxdetails&id=278771
http://australianmuseum.net.au/Signal-Goby-Fusigobius-signipinnis-Hoese-Obika-1988
 

Fish described in 1988
signipinnis